Rossville is an unincorporated community in Warrington Township in York County, Pennsylvania, United States. Rossville is located at the intersection of Pennsylvania Route 74, Pennsylvania Route 177, and Old York Road northeast of Wellsville and southwest of Gifford Pinchot State Park.

References

Unincorporated communities in York County, Pennsylvania
Unincorporated communities in Pennsylvania